Denho Acar (born 1974 in Midyat), also known as Dano and Djingis Khan, is a mobster of Assyrian/Syriac descent and founder of the Swedish crime syndicate Original Gangsters (OGs).

Biography
Acar was born to Syriac-speaking parents in the town of Midyat in Turkey in 1974, and moved to Bergsjön, a suburb of the Swedish city Gothenburg, in 1985. He was involved in a number of criminal activities in his youth and stood trial for the first time in 1991, for two cases of assault with a deadly weapon. In 1993, he founded the Original Gangsters and a year later, he was imprisoned in Denmark for armed robbery. Since then, he's also been convicted of several other crimes.

In 2007, Acar fled to the tourist resort of Marmaris in Turkey because the Swedish police want him for an arson attack on a cafe in Gothenburg. He has served in the Turkish Army, and has also been charged with forgery by the Turkish government as he used a bogus Swedish passport to enter the country. He cannot be deported, however, as he is a Turkish national and has never been granted full citizenship by Sweden.

In early 2008, it was announced that he would hand over the formal leadership of the Original Gangsters in Sweden to the former gang vice-leader, Wojtek Walczak. He is still the gang's overall leader, however, and claims that he is now focusing on expanding the gang into Norway, Germany and the Netherlands.

His permanent residence permit was revoked by the Swedish government in August 2008, on the grounds that he is no longer considered to be a resident in the country.

References

1974 births
Living people
People from Midyat
Assyrian emigrants to Sweden
Turkish emigrants to Sweden
Swedish people of Assyrian/Syriac descent
Gang members
People from Gothenburg
Turkish criminals
Turkish crime bosses
Turkish people imprisoned abroad
Fugitives wanted by Sweden
Prisoners and detainees of Denmark